Seeing in the Dark is a 1970 collection of poems by the Swedish writer Tomas Tranströmer.

1970 books
Poetry by Tomas Tranströmer
Swedish poetry collections